The popemobile is a specially designed motor vehicle used by the pope of the Catholic Church during public appearances. It is usually considered the successor to the antiquated  and was designed to allow the pope to be more visible when greeting large crowds. 

There have been many different designs for popemobiles since Pope Paul VI first used a modified Lincoln Continental to greet crowds in New York City in 1965. Some are open air, while others have bulletproof glass walls to enclose the pope, deemed necessary after the 1981 assassination attempt of Pope John Paul II. Some allow the pope to sit, while others are designed to accommodate him standing. The variety of popemobiles allows the Roman Curia to select an appropriate one for each usage depending upon the level of security needed, distance, speed of travel, and the pope's preferences.

The vehicle registration plates of Vatican City all begin with the letters "SCV", an abbreviation of the Latin  ("Vatican City State"), followed by the vehicle fleet number. The registration plate for the Ford Focus currently used by Pope Francis is "SCV 00919". In the past, the popemobile has typically used registration plate "SCV 1", although plates numbered "SCV 2" to "SCV 9" have also been used.

History

This fell out of use after the incumbency of Pope Paul VI in 1978.

Since the beginning of the twentieth century, many automotive manufacturers have produced specially designed vehicles for the pope. The Ford Motor Company produced a series of cars based on its presidential limousines used in the United States. The custom-built 1964 Lehmann-Peterson was used by Pope Paul VI in his 1965 New York City visit and was reused in 1970 in Bogotá. Later, Paul VI used a Mercedes-Benz 600 Pullman-Landaulet. However, the term "popemobile" did not come into common usage until the pontificate of Pope John Paul II.

The first time that John Paul II traveled to his home country, the white vehicle was based on the Polish mark FSC Star, a small truck from a firm in Starachowice. For John Paul II's visit to Ireland in 1979, Ford Ireland donated a D series truck which was adapted by OBAM coachbuilders; in 2017 it was available for private rental in Dublin. It was bigger than the truck used later in Vatican City. Another popemobile was a modified Mercedes-Benz with a small windowed enclosure in the back where the pope sits. A converted 230 G Mercedes-Benz G-Class was built for John Paul II's visit to Germany in 1980. A later model was presented to John Paul II in June 2002 based on a Mercedes-Benz M-Class sports-utility vehicle built in the United States. A Fiat Campagnola was used during transit within Vatican City and during Masses at St. Peter's Square. 

Following the attempted assassination of John Paul II in 1981, the popemobile was fitted with bulletproof glass. British Leyland supplied both Leyland T45 lorry-based and Range Rover SUV-based armored popemobiles in 1982 for the pope's visit to the United Kingdom. One of the two T45-based vehicles used was sold at auction in 2006 for 37,000 GBP, the other is kept in the British Commercial Vehicle Museum in Leyland, UK. One of the Range Rovers is exhibited at the National Museum of Funeral History (Houston, Texas). The pope used a popemobile derived from the SEAT Panda model during his visit to Spain in 1982; this specific car was open-air with a grab handle in front so that the pope could stand still and greet the crowds while moving. The pope entered the Camp Nou football stadium in Barcelona, driving through the assembled crowds celebrating Mass for a congregation of over 121,000 on 17 November 1982.

During the pope's visit to Canada in 1984, a modified GMC Sierra was used as a base, rebuilt by the Thibault Fire Engines Company in Pierreville, Quebec. It was subsequently used for the 1998 papal visit to Cuba and was displayed at the Canada Science and Technology Museum in Ottawa in 2005. The second truck built by the Thibault Fire Engines Company was sent back to the Vatican in 1984.

During the papal visit to the United States in September 1987, a pair of Mercedes-Benz 230 G popemobiles were flown to Washington, D.C., and modified by the United States Secret Service to provide access to the papal compartment from the driver's cabin, a design that continued to be used after the trip. One of these vehicles has been retired and is currently on display at the Mercedes-Benz Museum in Stuttgart, Germany.

Philippine automobile manufacturer Francisco Motors produced the popemobile for John Paul II's visit to Manila for World Youth Day 1995. It was funded by voluntary contributions and had bulletproof windows and bombproof parts. For John Paul II's visit to Portugal, UMM created a special popemobile based on a 1992 chassis from the Alter II. It featured a  armored glass box on the rear with a chair for the pope. It also had air conditioning and outside loudspeakers connected to a microphone in the rear.

In 2002, John Paul II requested that the media stop referring to the car as the popemobile, saying that the term was "undignified". The popemobile most often used by Pope Benedict XVI when traveling abroad was a modified Mercedes-Benz M-Class sport utility vehicle with a special glass-enclosed room with its own oxygen supply built into the back of the vehicle. The pope enters through a rear door and ascends several steps. He sits in a chair made from white leather with gold trim which is then elevated into the glass room by a hydraulic lift, allowing the pope to be more easily seen. In addition to the driver, there is room for one passenger (usually a security agent) in the front of the vehicle. The glass-enclosed rear of the vehicle also has room for two papal aides who can sit in the area in front of the pope's elevated chair. The vehicle's security features include bulletproof glass windows and roof, able to withstand explosions, and reinforced, armored side panels and undercarriage designed to resist bomb blasts. At 2011 prices, the popemobile cost approximately 345,000 GBP.

On June 6, 2007, a German man tried to jump into Benedict XVI's uncovered popemobile as the pontiff began his general audience. The pope was not hurt and did not even appear to notice that the man had jumped over the protective barrier in the square and had grabbed onto the white Fiat popemobile as it passed. At least eight security officers were trailing the vehicle as it moved slowly through the square. They subsequently grabbed the man and wrestled him to the ground, before he was interrogated by Vatican police.

In 2019, Pope Francis received a Dacia Duster to be used as the popemobile during his visit to Romania.

Usage by Francis

Pope Francis shows a preference for a simpler lifestyle and simpler cars. As a cardinal, he often used public transport. On the night of his election, he rode with the other cardinals in a minibus back to their hotel instead of using a papal limousine. For trips within the Vatican City, he uses a small Ford Focus from the Vatican motor pool. He also drives himself around the city in a 1984 Renault 4 presented to him by Italian Father Renzo Zocca.

A Kia Soul was used as the Popemobile in August 2014 when he visited South Korea.

Italian automaker Fiat, the traditional supplier of papal cars, supplied Pope Francis with the Fiat 500L used for his visit to the United States on 22–27 September 2015. Fiat also supplied the Jeep Wrangler he used in Ecuador in July 2015.

During his visit in the Philippines, the Popemobile's model was an Isuzu D-Max.

Gallery

See also 
Transport in Vatican City
Index of Vatican City-related articles
Sedia gestatoria

References

External links 

 Popemobile by Thibault Fire Engine

Holy See
Road transport of heads of state
Transport in Vatican City